Quercus aliena, the galcham oak or oriental white oak, is a species of oak in the family Fagaceae, in the white oak section Quercus.

Description

The flowers monecious catkins. A long-lived tree, it is slow-growing.

Taxonomy

Three to five varieties are accepted:
Quercus aliena var. aliena. Leaf margin wavy; leaf greyish below.
Quercus aliena var. acutiserrata Maxim. Leaf margin serrated, with sharp serration; leaf densely hairy below with greyish hairs.
Quercus aliena var. pekingensis Schottky. Leaf margin serrated, with rounded serration; leaf glabrous or only slightly hairy below.
Quercus aliena var. alticupulifirmis H.Wei Jen & L.M.Wang (not accepted by Flora of China).
Quercus aliena var. pellucida Blume (not accepted by Flora of China).

Hybrids between Quercus aliena and several other oaks in Quercus sect. Quercus are known.

Common names 
In China it is called ruìchí húlì, or húlì. Quercus aliena var. acutiserrata is referred to as ruìchí húlì, while var. aliena is referred to as húlì. In Japan it is called naragashiwa.

Distribution 
It is native to East Asian states of Korea, Japan (where it occurs in Honshu, Shikoku, and Kyushu), mainland China (where it occurs in the provinces of Anhui, Gansu, Guangdong, Guangxi, Guizhou, Hebei, Henan, Hubei, Hunan, Jiangsu, Jiangxi, Liaoning, Shaanxi, Shandong, Shanxi, Sichuan, Yunnan, and Zhejiang) and Taiwan.

Cultivation and uses
The wood is used in East Asia for boat building and wood flooring for houses. The seeds can be crushed into a powder and used as a soup thickener and for mixing into cereals and breads. The seeds when roasted can also be used as a substitute for coffee. Galls produced by the larvae of insects are a rich source of tannin.

Quercus aliena was introduced to Europe in 1908, but remains rare in cultivation outside of its native area. The taproot is deep, making older plants difficult to move. It grows in full sun or partial shade and tolerates strong winds. It can grow in almost any type of soil as long as not waterlogged.

References

Plants described in 1851
aliena
Trees of Japan
Trees of Korea